Solhah Singaarr is a Hindi serial that airs on Sahara One channel.

Plot 
The show is based on the story of Meera, a carefree teenager who believes the world to be picture-perfect and rosy. She is very close to everyone in the Bharadwaj family, and her life revolves around playing with children in and around the bylanes of Benares and tasting the pickles made by the elders of the house. One day her father Kumarvardhan Bharadwaj died and her mother Alaknanda Bharadwaj became a widow. Meera was very sad about her mother's new life. She had found that her mother's first lover was her younger paternal uncle Shantanu Bharadwaj and her mother also loved him. She tried a lot to remarry her mother to his uncle by going against the rules, priests and her grandmother Rajeshwari Bharadwaj's order. She also marries Sumer (eldest son of Chaturvedis) by forgetting her love Abhimanyu. Going to her in-laws, she got a new name, Shagun, and she got to know that Sumer does not love her and in Sumer's horoscope, there is death. She tried a lot to deny the death of Sumer. Sumer loved another girl but that girl loves his money. One day Shagun learned that Sumer loved another girl. She went to that girl to explain her to leave Sumer but she denies and Shagun announces her a war. One day Sumer wants to marry that girl and at the spot, Shagun was there explaining to Sumer their relationship but Sumer denies it. Suddenly stones were falling and fire was lit up everywhere, that girl went away leaving Sumer alone and Shagun saved him. At home, Sumer realizes his mistake and accepts Shagun. They were living very well but Sumer's step-mother Triveni and her son Shakti planned Sumer's death. He was saved every time by Shagun and Shagun learned about her mother-in-law's plans and Shagun tried to explain her but in vain. One day everyone gets to know that in Shagun horoscope there was not the yog of husband long life. The culprit was found and it was Shagun's aunt Iravati Bharadwaj and sulakshana with chaube maharaj but Shagun returned to her in-laws as she had saved Sumer's life every time. By time Shagun and her mother were pregnant but her mother slipped and she lost her child. The truth was hidden to everyone and Shagun and her mother went to Shagun's grandma. Shagun's mother found someone who was pregnant and can't occupy the child.

Cast 

 Keerti Gaekwad Kelkar as Meera Bharadwaj (after plastic surgery) / Advocate Meera Karan Kapoor
 Akangsha Rawat as Meera Bharadwaj (before plastic surgery) / Sargam Shagun Sumer Chaturvedi
 Akangsha Rawat as Sargam Samar Pratap Singh / Shefali
 Sachin Tyagi as Sumer Chaturvedi
 Sachin Tyagi as Samar Pratap Singh / Lala
 Keerti Gaekwad Kelkar as Sonia Shakti Chaturvedi (actress) / Fake Sheela Bar Dancer Shagun Sumer Chaturvedi
 Keerti Gaekwad Kelkar as Sheela (bar dancer)
 Mrinal Kulkarni as Alaknanda Kumarvardhan Bharadwaj / Alaknanda Shantanu Bharadwaj, and Meera's stepmother (2006-2007)
 Sudha Chandran as Rajeshwari Bharadwaj, Meera's grandmother (2006-2007)
 Kishori Shahane / Utkarsha Naik as Triveni Tribhuvan Chaturvedi, Sumer's stepmother and Shakti's mother
 Faisal Raza Khan as Shakti Chaturvedi, Sumer's stepbrother
 Karan Singh Grover as Abhimanyu, Meera's childhood friend and lover (2006-2007)
 Vaquar Shaikh as Shantanu Bharadwaj, Rajeshwari's son and Alaknanda's second husband (2006-2007)
 Anuj Saxena as Kumarvardhan Bharadwaj, Rajeshwari's son, Alaknanda's first husband and Meera's father (2006)
 Rajeshwari Sachdev as Vasundhara, Kumarvardhan's girlfriend, Meera's mother and Agnishikha's elder sister (2006)
 Shalini Kapoor as Iravati Bharadwaj, Rajeshwari's daughter, Rajshekhar's wife and Mayank's mother (2006-2007)
 Adarsh Gautam as Tribhuvan Chaturvedi, Sumer's father
 Hemant Chaddha as Vikram Chaturvedi, Sumer's younger brother
 Shabnam Sayed / Seema Malik as Damini Vikram Chaturvedi
 Vaibhavi Upadhyay / Shweta Gautam as Urvashi Chaturvedi / Urvashi Shiv Chopra, Sumer's younger sister and Shiv's wife
 Gireesh Sahdev as Yashvardhan Bharadwaj, Rajeshwari's son (2006-2007)
 Gaurav Chopra as Shiv Chopra, Urvashi's husband
 Manasi Varma as Agnishikha, Vasundhara's younger sister, Mayank's wife (2007)
 Vishal Watwani as Mayank, Iravati and Rajshekhar's son and Agnishikha's husband (2007)
 Navina Bole as Gauri Bharadwaj, Shantanu's daughter (2006-2007)
 Sonali Verma as Sulakshana Yashvardhan Bharadwaj (2006-2007)
 Sameer Sharma as Dr. Veer (2007)
 Vaishnavi Mahant as Vasundhara, Kumarvardhan's girlfriend, Meera's mother and Agnishikha's elder sister (2007)
 Shilpa Shinde as Agnishikha, Vasundhara's younger sister, Mayank's wife (2007)
 Apara Mehta as Subhadra, Alaknanda's maternal aunt
 Bhuvan Chopra as Rajshekhar, Iravati's husband and Mayank's father
 Adita Wahi as Menka (2007)
 Ekta Sharma as Shikha
 Pankaj Badra as Shlok (2006-2007)
 Saurabh Dubey as Kulpurohit Ji (2006-2007)
 Prithvi Zutshi as Dr. Singh (2008)
 Mugdha Chaphekar as Akanksha Bharadwaj (2006)
 Tej Sapru as Chaubey Maharaj (2006-2007)
 Narendra Gupta as Dr. Veer's father (2007)
 Vijay Bhatia as Akrosh, Chaubey Maharaj's son (2006-2007)
 Manoj Bidwai

External links 
Official Website

Indian television soap operas
Sahara One original programming
Indian drama television series
2006 Indian television series debuts
2008 Indian television series endings